Klump can refer to:

 Klump, a village in Winzenburg, Lower Saxony, Germany
 Kelly Klump, American psychologist
 Midge Klump, a character in Archie comics
 Sherman Klump, a character from The Nutty Professor
 Klumps, characters in Donkey Kong video games

See also
 Klumpp

German-language surnames
Surnames from nicknames